Jason Eisener is a Canadian screenwriter, producer, editor and director.

Life and career

Grindhouse faux trailer contest and Hobo with a Shotgun (2007 - 2011)
In 2007, Eisener entered and won the Grindhouse fake trailer contest hosted by Robert Rodriguez and the SXSW Festival, leading to a film of the same name being made a few years later: Hobo with a Shotgun. In 2008, Eisener co-wrote and directed the Christmas slasher short film Treevenge.

Other projects (2012 - 2017) 
Eisener directed The ABCs of Deaths Y is for Youngbuck segment and V/H/S/2s Alien Abduction Slumber Party segment. 
In 2017, he was the 2nd unit director on the Adam Wingard adaptation of Death Note and the editor on Goon: Last of the Enforcers.

Dark Side of the Ring 
Dark Side of the Ring premiered on Viceland on April 10, 2019 and the series focuses on controversial subjects and events within the realm of professional wrestling. Eisner serves as the series director, producer and creator alongside Evan Husney.

Upcoming projects (2017–present) 
As of 2017, Eisener is in pre-production on a film, an adaptation of the comic New York City Outlaws.

His next movie, Kids vs. Aliens, is described as "aliens attacking a house party" and has premiered at Fantastic Fest on September 23, 2022.

Influences
In an interview with DIY magazine in 2011, Eisener cited Dario Argento, Lucio Fulci, Walter Hill, and Brian Trenchard-Smith as influences.

Filmography
Short films

'''Feature films

References

External links
 

Film directors from Nova Scotia
Canadian film editors
Canadian male screenwriters
21st-century Canadian screenwriters
Living people
Date of birth missing (living people)
Year of birth missing (living people)